Thoovanam is a 2007 Indian Tamil language film starring Adithya and Neshtra released in September 2007.

Plot
Karthi is an interior designer who hails from an affluent family. He and his friends lead happy lives in Chennai. Karthi comes across Anu in Pondicherry. She is brought by her NRI father, an extrovert. Karthi falls in love with Anu. Dejected at his love rejected by Anu, Karthi decides to take the extreme step. Eventually, he is saved by his friends. Anu learns of this and soon falls in love with him. It all boils down to a touchy climax. After knowing that Anu loves him, Karthi decides to spoil her life by spending a night with her and ditching her. Anu overhears his conversation with his friends, and yet continues to go as per Karthi's plan. His friend Abdullah advises him, but to no use. She spends a night with him in Pondicherry, and later reveals her awareness of his intentions. Anu marries Sree and vows never to see Karthi again.

Cast
Adithya
Nethra
Sriman
Bhanuchander

Soundtrack
"Eureka" - Harish Raghavendra
"Idhayam Irundha" - Vinaya
"Thoovanam" - SPB
"SMSla Kadhal" -Naresh Iyer, Mahathi, Vinaya, Sathyan
"Yedho Yedho" - Parasuram
"Yedho Yedho" (2) - Anuradha Sriram

Critical reception
Sify wrote "It is supposed to be a love story with a difference, but 15 minutes in to the film you just can't fathom what's going on. It's neither a pure vanilla love story nor an arty film. Directors S.Haricharan and Newton tries their best to be in a different genre but ends up falling between two stools". Indiaglitz wrote "Thoovanam manages a gentle drizzle though it promises a loads of rain." Behindwoods wrote "
The movie is directed by S. Haricharan and Newton who are also in-charge of story, screen play and dialogues. The duo have done a decent job with the script but the area of handling newcomers needs improvement which may have gone a long way in the presentation of the film. [..] The first half is a little slow but the second half makes up for the first one and is very gripping."

References

2007 films
2000s Tamil-language films